Nick in the Afternoon was a programming block on Nickelodeon that aired from 1994 to 1998 on weekday afternoons during the summer, hosted by Stick Stickly, a Mr. Bill like popsicle stick puppeteered by Rick Lyon and voiced by New Yorker Paul Christie (who would later voice Noggin mascot, Moose A. Moose until 2012). The 1998 stint ran from July until August. Henry and June's Summer replaced this Nickelodeon summer block a year later. Stick Stickly was later revived for the TeenNick 1990s' block The '90s Are All That.

Regular segments
During its first summer, the programming consisted of normal Nickelodeon shows that would have aired regardless, but come its second summer, Nick in the Afternoon made some key changes. Instead, it showed preselected Nicktoons with added segments such as "U-Pick" (viewers pick what show and episode they want to see) and U-Dip (viewers pick which substance Stick Stickly is dipped in or any substance at all using their bare feet). Viewers occasionally chose a program that had not been aired on Nick in many years, for example You Can't Do That on Television, or from time to time would select a Nick at Nite program such as I Love Lucy, The Munsters, or The Brady Bunch. The preselected segments were indicated by a dial using Stickly as the spinner, so as to keep the cartoons a surprise.

Stick Stickly's address
When giving viewers the address at which they could write him, Stick Stickly would sing a little (and easily memorized) jingle: "Write to me/Stick Stickly/PO Box 963/New York City/New York State/10108." After the Internet became mainstream, a note stating "...or e-mail me at nick.com" was added to the end.

Stick Stickly on The '90s Are All That
Stick Stickly segments from the block have been used in promotions for The '90s Are All That, and on September 6, 2011, during The '90s Are All That block, a commercial announced that Stick Stickly would be returning to television on Friday October 7, 2011 at midnight. The character has been updated for modern times, with a vocabulary that not only makes frequent reference to modern amenities such as Facebook,  flat screen TVs and Jersey Shore, but also has been updated with a more adult sense of humor to reflect the older late-night audience. Stickly hosts "U-Pick with Stick" each Friday, where users on The '90s Are All That website can request up to four shows to be seen. The winning "pick," which is decided by an online vote (another sign of modern times), is announced by Stick Stickly. Stickly is also taking questions by use of a Twitter hash tag, #POBox963, a reference to his old 1990s era jingle from Nick in the Afternoon.

It was later announced in December 2011 that U-Dip would also make a return, joining a long list of objects dropped on New Year's Eve at midnight.

Stick Stickly made an on-air appearance on The '90s Are All That from August 5–8, 2013, in which he hosted the "'90s Game Show Week" on the block, and returned to doing U-Picks in June 2015 as part of "Stick's Summer Down Adventures" which aired on Wednesday nights from June 17–July 15, 2015 (the last week being Stick's Picks). This was the result of the re-branding of '90s Are All That with The Splat.

See also
U Pick Live
Nick Studio 10

External links
Stick Stickly Returns!
90s are all that with Stick Stickly!

Television shows featuring puppetry
Nickelodeon programming blocks
1994 American television series debuts
1998 American television series endings
Television programming blocks in the United States